State Road 26 (IN 26 or SR 26) is an east–west discontinuous state road in the central part of the US state of Indiana. The western end of the western segment is at the Illinois border, where it continues as Illinois Route 9. The highway passes through rural areas of Warren and Tippecanoe counties, before ending near West Lafayette. The eastern segment begins at an interchange with Interstate 65 (I-65) and heads east passing through the cities of Kokomo, Hartford City, and Portland, before ending at the Ohio border, where it continues east as Ohio State Route 119.

The originally designated road along modern SR 26 was SR 29, running between Lafayette and US 31, with SR 26 being routed between Bloomington and Madison. In the mid-1920s the state of Indiana renumbered its state road system and the SR 26 designated was moved to its contemporary alignment. During the early 1930s the route was extended, with several segments of SR 26 added to the state system. The last major addition happen in the late 1930s between SR 9 and Hartford City. The entire roadway was paved in the 1960s. In December 2013, the Indiana Department of Transportation (INDOT) relinquished the road through West Lafayette and Lafayette to the two cities.

Route description
Most of the highway is two-lane undivided rural highway. There is a section east of Lafayette that is a four-lane highway. The road exists in two segments with the first running between the Illinois border, near the town of Ambia, and near West Lafayette. The second segment is routed between Lafayette and the Ohio border.

Western segment

SR 26 is a two-lane highway that connects with Illinois Route 9 and SR 352 at the Illinois state line in western Warren County. The road heads east passing through agricultural land, before turning south concurrent with U.S. Route 41 (US 41). The concurrency heads southeast, before SR 26 leaves the concurrency heading east towards Lafayette. The road makes a few curves, but the roadway stays generally east–west in direction. North of Pine Village SR 26 joins SR 55. The concurrency enters town on Main Street. At the intersection of Main Street and Lafayette Street, SR 26 turns east onto Lafayette Street, while SR 55 continues south on Main Street. The street passes some businesses before reaching the east side of town. The road enters rural Warren County before entering rural Tippecanoe County. The highway turns towards the southwest before passing by many houses on the west edge of West Lafayette. SR 26 passes north of Purdue University Forestry and Natural Resources Farm, before an intersection with US 52/US 231. At this intersection the SR 26 designation ends, but the roadway continues east as State Street, passing through West Lafayette and heading towards Lafayette.

Eastern segment 
The eastern segment of SR 26 begins, as a continuation of South Street, at an interchange with I-65 on the east side of Lafayette. The road heads east as a four-lane highway, passing through both commercial and residential properties. As the road continues east it becomes a two-lane road, with some curves, and passes through farmland. The highway enters rural Clinton County, before entering Rossville. In Rossville SR 26 is concurrent with Main Street and passes through a business district. The business district becomes houses as the street heads east. The road enters the downtown area of Rossville passing through an intersection with Plank Street (US 421/SR 39). East of Plank Street, SR 26 passes more houses before leaving Rossville. East of Rossville, SR 26 passes through agricultural land, heading due east towards Kokomo. In rural Clinton County SR 26 has an intersection with SR 75, before passing through Sedalia and Geetingsville. The road enters Middlefork and has an intersection with SR 29. East of Middlefork the highway enters Howard County.

In Howard County the road enters Russiaville, passing through town on Main Street. While in Russiaville, Main Street passes through commercial and residential properties. SR 26 leaves Russiaville and enters rural Howard County, passing through mostly farmland. The road enters Kokomo, passing through the Indian Heights neighborhood. While in Indian Heights the road passes through an intersection with SR 931. East of SR 931, SR 26 leaves Kokomo and passes through the community of Oakford. After passing through Oakford, SR 26 has an interchange with US 31, before passing through rural Howard County, having intersections with SR 19 and SR 213.

The road leaves Howard County and enters Grant County and passes through an intersection with SR 13, in Point Isabel. East of Point Isabel SR 26 has an intersection with SR 37 and SR 9, before entering Fairmount. In Fairmount SR 26 is routed along Eighth Street and passes through residential part of town. Before leaving town the street has an at-grade crossing with a Norfolk Southern railroad track. East of Fairmount SR 26 has an interchange with I-69, before crossing over the Mississinewa River. After the river SR 26 turns north at a four-way intersection with County Road 900 South and County Road 950 East, formerly SR 221. SR 26 heads north for about  towards the town of Upland, before turning east at a four-way intersection with SR 22 and County Road 700 South, southeast of Taylor University. The road then leaves Grant County and enters Blackford County.

SR 26 then enters Hartford City on Water Street before curving onto Washington Street, prior to an intersection with SR 3. East of SR 3, Washington Street enters the Hartford City Courthouse Square Historic District and passes on the south side of the Blackford County Courthouse. SR 26 leaves the historic district and turns south on Mill Street for one block, before turning east onto Water Street and crossing a Norfolk Southern Railroad track. The highway leaves Hartford City and enters rural Blackford County, before coming to an intersection with the north end of SR 167 at the Blackford–Jay county line. SR 26 joins SR 1 for a short distance heading south, before SR 26 turns east towards Portland. The road joins SR 67 before entering Portland. The two state roads enter Portland on Votaw Street, passing through mostly commercial lots. At US 27 (Meridian Street) SR 67 turns north concurrent with US 27, while SR 26 turns south concurrent with US 27. Meridian Street heads south passing through the Portland Commercial Historic District, about a block east of the Jay County Courthouse. SR 26 turns east on Water Street, while US 27 continues south across the Salamonie River. Water Street leaves the historic district and passes through a residential part of town, before leaving Portland. As the road leaves Portland it crosses over the Salamonie River. East of Portland SR 26 parallels the Salamonie River, before the highway crosses over the river again. The road passes through agricultural land, before the Ohio state lines the road curves towards the southeast. SR 26 ends at the Ohio–Indiana border, just outside of Fort Recovery, the roadway continues east into Ohio as State Route 119.

History
SR 26 was originally designated between Bloomington and Madison along approximately the modern alignment of SR 46 and SR 7. The highway ran between SR 22 in Bloomington and SR 40 in Madison, passing through Columbus. When the Indiana State Highway Commission renumber the state road system in 1926 in coordination with the creation of the United States Numbered Highway System, the SR 26 designated was moved north to its modern alignment.

The modern SR 26 was designated on October 1, 1926 on a route that ran between Lafayette and Oakford, this route was previously known as SR 29. The modern route of SR 26 between the Indiana–Illinois state line and US 41 was added between 1927 and 1928, as SR 22. During 1930 a state road was proposed between US 41 and Lafayette and between US 31 and SR 9. Also at this time a state road was proposed from Upland east to the Ohio–Indiana state line. Between late 1930 and early 1932 the highway commission added SR 26 between US 31 and SR 9 to the state road system and the SR 22 designation west of US 41 was changed to SR 26. During this time frame SR 26 was added to the state road system between Hartford City and SR 67 and the modern route of SR 26 between the modern eastern end of SR 22 and Hartford City became part of SR 22. During 1932 the proposed route between Portland and the Ohio–Indiana state line was commissioned as part of SR 26 and the small north–south segment of modern SR 26, southeast of Upland, was commissioned as part of SR 221. SR 26 proposed to be extended east from SR 9 to SR 221 between 1936 and 1937. The road was extended from SR 9 to Hartford City between late 1938 and early 1939. The entire road was paved between 1966 and 1967.

SR 26 formerly passed through the campus of Purdue University in West Lafayette, where it was concurrent with State Street, and through Lafayette as South Street and Columbia Street. The segment of roadway between the US 231 junction in the west and Interstate 65 interchange in the east were relinquished to the cities of West Lafayette and Lafayette in December 2013; SR 26 is now discontinuous.

Major intersections

References

External links 

026
Transportation in Blackford County, Indiana
Transportation in Jay County, Indiana
Transportation in Grant County, Indiana
Transportation in Warren County, Indiana
Transportation in Tippecanoe County, Indiana
Transportation in Clinton County, Indiana
Transportation in Howard County, Indiana